Elytroleptus luteicollis is a species of beetle in the family Cerambycidae. It was described by Skiles & Chemsak in 1982.

References

Elytroleptus
Beetles described in 1982